Yawd Serk is a Shan ethnic and political leader in Myanmar (Burma), who was chairman of the Restoration Council of Shan State and commander in chief of the Shan State Army - South (SSA-S) until his resignation on 3 February 2014. He was a major contributor to peace talks between major Shan rebel factions and the government of Myanmar in the 2000s and 2010s.

References

Living people
People from Shan State
Burmese rebels
Burmese politicians
1959 births